Kelmscott is a southeastern suburb of Perth, Western Australia in the local government area of the City of Armadale.

Kelmscott was one of four initial townsites established in the Swan River Colony. It was named after Kelmscott, Oxfordshire, the birthplace of the first Anglican clergyman in the colony, Thomas Hobbes Scott (1783–1860).

The suburb of Kelmscott is bisected by the Canning River. On the western side of the river is the flat coastal plain upon which most of Perth is situated. This area includes the Stargate Kelmscott and Kelmscott Village shopping areas along Albany Highway, the light industrial area, the Kelmscott Senior High School and a residential area. To the east, the suburb rises into the western Darling Scarp.

Kelmscott celebrated its 175th anniversary on 9 October 2005. The highlight of the celebrations was the running of the Hotham Valley Railway steam locomotive Pm706 from Perth railway station to Kelmscott station, with stops at Cannington, Gosnells, then Armadale station. This was the first running of steam "under the wires" on the Transperth network for some time. The event was specially arranged by the Public Transport Authority, whose Minister is also the member of parliament for the local electorate.

Kelmscott is home of the first Red Rooster restaurant, as well as Australia's busiest drive-through KFC service.

Schools
 Kelmscott Primary School (1882) - one of the first primary schools established in Western Australia.
 Kelmscott Senior High School (1973) years 7–12.
 Clifton Hills Primary School (1972)
 Sowilo Community High School (2000) - independent school for young people at educational risk

Annual events 
 The Kelmscott Show, run by the Kelmscott Agricultural Society, has been held annually since 1897 (with the exception of the years 1930-1938 and 2020 due to the Coronavirus Pandemic).

Bushfire 2011 
On 6 February 2011, a declared total fire ban day, Robert James Stevens, 56, an ex-policeman, was using an angle grinder at his home and started the fire on his private property adjacent to the Brookton Highway in the Roleystone / Kelmscott area. A total of 72 homes were destroyed and 37 homes damaged. This is the single biggest house loss in Western Australia to a single bushfire event. Remarkably, 28 per cent of residents in Kelmscott and Roleystone left their homes only just in time and were not alerted.

Stevens was charged under the Bushfire Act with one count of carrying out an activity in the open air that causes or is likely to cause a fire, and pleaded not guilty. Due to a legal technicality associated with complexities in how the total fire ban was declared, charges were dropped, and Mr Stevens was then awarded $4250 to cover his legal costs. His home was saved by firefighters. 

Some Kelmscott residents managed to return to their homes in the fire zone, as described by Premier Colin Barnett, and could be seen on their balconies giving hope to fellow residents that their properties were safe.

See also
 Kelmscott railway station

References

External links

Suburbs of Perth, Western Australia
Suburbs in the City of Armadale